Thomas R. Kratochwill is the Sears-Bascom Professor of School Psychology at the University of Wisconsin–Madison, where he directs the School Psychology Program. He is also Director of the Educational and Psychological Training Center, an interdisciplinary unit for applied training for Counseling Psychology, Rehabilitation Psychology and Special Education, and School Psychology. He co-directs (with Hugh Johnston, MD) the Child and Adolescent Mental Health and Education Resource Center and is a member of the Coordinating Committee of the Prevention Science Program.

His research interests are primarily in the area of diagnosis, assessment, and treatment of child psychopathology. Particular interests include the application of mediator-based (parent and teacher) treatments in schools for the prevention and treatment of childhood problems and training psychologists in consultation and therapy.

Other research interests include assessment and treatment of childhood anxiety and related disorders (e.g., selective mutism, phobias) as well as psychopharmacological treatments for these problems.

Kratochwill's teaching interests include evidence-based prevention and interventions, consultation, applied research, and single-case research design.

He is founding editor of the journal School Psychology Quarterly. He is editor of Advances in School Psychology (annual research series), and associate editor of Behavior Therapy, Journal of Applied Behavior Analysis, and School Psychology Review.

Education
Kratochwill earned his Ph.D. from the University of Wisconsin–Madison in 1973.

Awards and honors
Kratochwill's research has received recognition from national and state organizations, most recently the American Psychological Association's (APA) Distinguished Contribution to Education and Training in Psychology Award.

In 1995 he received an award for Outstanding Contributions to the Advancement of Scientific Knowledge in Psychology from the Wisconsin Psychological Association and was awarded the Senior Scientist Award from APA Division 16. The Wisconsin Psychological Association selected his research for its Margaret Bernauer Psychology Research Award and in 1995, 2001, and 2002 the APA Division 16 journal School Psychology Quarterly selected one of his articles as best research of the year.

He received the Distinguished Service Award from the School of Education at the University of Wisconsin–Madison and in 2005 received the Jack I. Bardon Distinguished Achievement Award from APA Division 16.

In 1977 he received the APA's Lightner Witner Award and in 1981 was awarded the Outstanding Research Contributions Award from the Arizona State Psychological Association.

He was selected as the founding editor of the APA Division 16 journal School Psychology Quarterly from 1984 to 1992. He is Past President of the Society for the Study of School Psychology and Co-Chair (with Kimberly Hoagwood) of the Task Force on Evidence-Based Interventions in School Psychology.

He serves on the APA BEA Task Force on Translating Psychological Science into Classroom Practice and the APA Task Force on Evidence-Based Practice for Children and Adolescents.

References

External links
Dr. Thomas R. Kratochwill at the University of Wisconsin–Madison website

Year of birth missing (living people)
Living people
Educational psychologists
University of Wisconsin–Madison alumni
University of Wisconsin–Madison faculty
American educational psychologists